The 1994–95 edition of the EHF Champions League was won by CD Bidasoa Irún in their debut at the competition in a final match against the champions of the last two pre-Champions League editions, RK Zagreb.

Preliminary round

|}

First round

|}

Eight finals

|}

Group stage

Group A

Group B

Final

References
   EHF

C
C
EHF Champions League seasons